At the 2011 Pan Arab Games, the golf events were held at Doha Golf Club in Doha, Qatar from 11–16 December. A total of 4 events were contested.

Medal summary

Men

Women

Medal table

References

External links
Golf at official website

Pan Arab Games
Events at the 2011 Pan Arab Games
2011 Pan Arab Games
2011 Pan Arab Games